Valley Forge is a village in the southwest corner of Springettsbury Township, York County, Pennsylvania, United States.  The community is located just to the northeast of the city of York near the intersection of US Route 30 and North Sherman Street.  Harley-Davidson's York plant is nominally located in Valley Forge.

Two Valley Forges 
This Valley Forge is one of two communities in Pennsylvania with the same name. The other village is the one associated with the pivotal winter encampment of the Continental Army during the American Revolutionary War. Since the Continental Congress spent that same winter in York, near this Valley Forge, there is room for confusion. The other Valley Forge is also the control city used on Interstate 76.

 
Springettsbury Township, York County, Pennsylvania
Unincorporated communities in York County, Pennsylvania
Unincorporated communities in Pennsylvania